Columbia Township is one of ten townships in Boone County, Missouri, USA.  As of 2012, its population was 41,475. The township contains the eastern half of the City of Columbia including most of the original (downtown) area.

History
Columbia Township was established in 1821. Settled mainly by settlers from the upland south (Kentucky, Virginia, and Tennessee), the township was named after its original city Columbia, founded along the Flat Branch and county seat of Boone County.

Geography

The township contains one incorporated settlement: Columbia. The unincorporated community of Shaw is also within the bounds. Hydrologically, the area is mainly drained by Hinkson Creek. Other waterways include: the Flat Branch, Grindstone Creek, Gans Creek, and Clear Creek.

References

External links
 City-Data.com

Townships in Boone County, Missouri
Townships in Missouri